Martin John Clark (born 13 October 1968 in Motherwell), is a Scottish football player and coach.

Clark began his career with Hamilton Academical but did not make a senior appearance for them. He was signed for Clyde, by his father John, and spent two years with the club before transferring to Nottingham Forest. His move to Nottingham was unsuccessful, and after two loan spells, he joined Mansfield Town. He returned to Scotland in 1992, joining Clyde's arch-rivals Partick Thistle. He stayed there for a season, before rejoining Clyde. He went on to have spells with Macclesfield Town and Albion Rovers, before retiring in 1997 after a short spell in the juniors with Armadale Thistle.

Clark has also worked as a coach for Jim McInally at Greenock Morton, youth teams at Celtic and East Stirlingshire.

References

External links

Living people
1968 births
Footballers from Motherwell
Scottish footballers
Hamilton Academical F.C. players
Clyde F.C. players
Nottingham Forest F.C. players
Falkirk F.C. players
Mansfield Town F.C. players
Partick Thistle F.C. players
Macclesfield Town F.C. players
Albion Rovers F.C. players
Armadale Thistle F.C. players
Greenock Morton F.C. non-playing staff
Scottish Football League players
Scottish Junior Football Association players
Association football midfielders